The Seattle Open Invitational was a professional golf tournament on the PGA Tour in the northwest United States, in the greater Seattle area. It was played eight times over three decades under five names at three locations.

History
The first Seattle Open was held  in 1936 at Inglewood Golf Club in Kenmore in early August. Macdonald Smith won an  playoff with a course record 65 (–8), six strokes ahead of runner-up Ralph Guldahl, who won the next two U.S Opens  and the Masters in 1939. The next Seattle Open was played nine years later in October 1945 at Broadmoor Golf Club in Seattle and won by Byron Nelson, with a world record 259 (–21) and a victory margin of 13 strokes. He won a record eighteen tournaments in 1945, including eleven consecutive.

Sixteen years later, the tour returned to Seattle in 1961 at Broadmoor in mid-September with the Greater Seattle Open Invitational.  won in a sudden-death playoff, over Bob Rosburg and Jacky Cupit; Marr shot a final round 63 (–7) and birdied the first extra hole  In 1962, it was renamed the Seattle World's Fair Open Invitational as part of the region's celebration of the 1962 Seattle World's Fair. The victor by two strokes was a 22-year-old rookie from Ohio named Jack Nicklaus. It was his second tour win and first non-major, following a playoff victory over Arnold Palmer in June at the U.S. Open at Oakmont. Nicklaus had won $50,000 in the exhibition World Series of Golf the week before, and won in Portland the following week for his third tour title.

The last event in 1966, the Greater Seattle-Everett Classic, was held at the Everett Golf & Country Club. It was won by Homero Blancas, one stroke ahead of Cupit, a two-time runner-up.

Inglewood later hosted the GTE Northwest Classic on the Senior PGA Tour, from 1987 through 1995.

Venues

Winners

Playoffs
1936: 18-hole playoff, Smith 65 (–8), Guldahl 71 (–2).
1961: Marr sank a  birdie putt on the first playoff hole, a par-5, for the win.
1965: Brewer had a tap-in par on the first playoff hole, a par-4, and Sanders bogeyed.

Notes

References

External links
Broadmoor Golf Club
Inglewood Golf Club
Everett Golf & Country Club

Former PGA Tour events
Golf in Washington (state)